Doris Downes (born 1961, Doris Raley Downes) is an American botanical artist, painter of natural history, and a writer for the Environmental Governance Institute. She also works in Interactive Design, and was Creative Director at Sotheby's, before becoming a full-time artist in 2003. She is also the literary executor to Robert Hughes.

Life and work
Downes was raised in Fredericksburg, Virginia and St. Mary's Maryland.  She is the daughter of the late Fielder Bradford Downes of Fredericksburg and Doris Anne Downes (née Raley) of St. Mary's.  She is the niece of artist Willard A. Downes (1908–2000) and of former Democrat State Senator from Maryland, J. Frank Raley (1926–2012).  She became interested in flowers when hiking in woodlands near her home, whilst young; she was taught to draw by her father, who was an artist and encouraged her to see nature from an artistic viewpoint.

She earned a joint degree in arts and sciences from the University of Maryland. Her career started as an art director in New York City in publication design and interactive design including Newsweek, Condé Nast Publications and The Wall Street Journal, She was awarded a Silver award from SPD (The Society of Publication Designers) and a Gold Ozzie Award for Design Excellence. She became Vice President and Creative Director of Sotheby's and Sotheby's Interactive.

She has two children by her first marriage, Freeborn Garrettson Jewett IV and Fielder Douglas Jewett. She met the Australian art critic, Robert Hughes in 1997. and in 1998, he had a near-fatal car crash, was in a coma and then faced prosecution. She flew to Australia to be with him. He said, "Apart from being a talented painter, she saved my life, my emotional stability, such as it is," and, "I really wouldn't have got through it if it hadn't been for Doris. I know that's a sentimental thing to say—it's the sort of thing you're supposed to say—but it is true." In 2001, she married Hughes in the Saló de Cent, the town hall in Barcelona. Hughes died in 2012 at Calvary Hospital in the Bronx, New York, while in hospice care.  In 2001.  Downes has continued to concentrate on painting, specialising in flowers, birds and other motifs related to natural history .

While in employment, she had shown her work in the Sotheby's gallery in New York. Her first solo exhibition after becoming a full-time artist was held in 2003 at the Sala Parés Gallery in Barcelona, in the Espacio Fama, showing watercolours of orchids, hibiscos, irises and tulips, painted from life. Olga Spiegel described them as "worked with a modern sensitivity that makes use of the expressive and tactile values of the paper"[a] and said:

J. J. Navarro Arisa in El Mundo considered her work to be proof that flower painting does not have to be an anachronism or merely decorative pastime, but can demonstrate a contemporary sensitivity,[c] and that she exemplified a combination of scientific and aesthetic inquiry.[d] Hughes wrote the catalogue for the show.

A series of her limited edition prints were published by Circulo del Arte, in Barcelona; these were completed in collaboration with the lithographer, Vincenz Aznar. In 2005, her work was included in the show, Art and the Garden, curated by Ronny Cohen at the Spanierman Gallery, New York. She is an artist in the book, American Floral: a Survey, (published by Eaton Fine Art); she has exhibited in the Summer Show at the Royal Academy in London; and is a member of the National Association of Women in the Arts (N.A.W.A.) and the American Society of Botanical Artists.

Downes lives and works in New York and has a farmhouse in Briarcliff Manor, New York.

References

External links
Doris Downes official web site
Art Times Literary Journal, Doris Downes Critique, by Raymond J. Steiner
Gerald Peters Modern Perspectives Exhibition, 2010
The Spanierman Gallery at East Hampton
Doris Downes, Robert Hughes: The New York Times, "After Calamity, a Critic's Soft Landing", Joyce Wadler
 Robert Hughes writes about a fishing trip with Doris Downes

Date of birth missing (living people)
Place of birth missing (living people)
20th-century American painters
21st-century American painters
American art directors
American women painters
American still life painters
Living people
People from Fredericksburg, Virginia
Botanical illustrators
People from Briarcliff Manor, New York
1961 births
20th-century American women artists
21st-century American women artists
Women graphic designers